Charisse Marie Sampson (born September 1, 1974) is an American former professional basketball player for the Seattle Storm.

References

External links

1974 births
Living people
American expatriate basketball people in Spain
American women's basketball players
Basketball players from Los Angeles
Guards (basketball)
Kansas Jayhawks women's basketball players
New England Blizzard players
Seattle Storm draft picks
Seattle Storm players